Mamoudou Gassama (born 1996) is a Malian-French citizen, living in France who, on 26 May 2018, climbed four stories on the exterior of a block of flats in the 18th arrondissement of Paris ( 51 rue Marx-Dormoy) in 30 seconds to save a four-year-old boy who was hanging from a balcony. The child’s father had apparently left the boy unattended to go shopping, and was subsequently charged with leaving his son unsupervised.

Aftermath
Paris Mayor Anne Hidalgo called Gassama "Spider-Man of the 18th" in reference to the city’s 18th arrondissement (district) where the rescue took place. On 28 May 2018, President Emmanuel Macron met Gassama at the Élysée Palace to thank him personally. He was awarded the Médaille d’honneur pour acte de courage et de dévouement and offered a role in the fire service which he subsequently took up; as of December 2018 he is working a ten month contract as an intern. At the instigation of President Macron, Gassama was made a French citizen in September 2018.

Personal life
Gassama was born in Mali. He travelled to Europe via Burkina Faso, Niger and Libya, where he was arrested and beaten. He crossed the Mediterranean and obtained papers to stay legally in Italy, but travelled to France in September 2017 to join his elder brother. News reports emphasized the similarity between Gassama and Lassana Bathily, a Muslim immigrant from Mali who was hailed as a hero in France and offered citizenship for his bravery in the Hypercacher kosher supermarket siege of 2015. On 24 June 2018 Gassama received the BET Humanitarian Award in Los Angeles.

References

1996 births
Living people
21st-century French people
21st-century Malian people
French firefighters
Malian emigrants to France